Makio may refer to:

Makio, grind used in Aggressive Inline Skating
 MakiO, the yearbook of Ohio State University

People with given name
, Japanese astronomer
, Japanese voice actor
, Japanese former cyclist

People with surname
, Japanese architectural translator

Japanese-language surnames
Japanese masculine given names